Bal Krishna Goyal (19 November 1935 – 20 February 2018) was a cardiologist and medical educationist from India. He was an Honorary Consultant Cardiologist to the Texas Heart Institute at Houston, USA.

Goyal was the honorary dean and chief cardiologist at the Bombay Hospital Institute of Medical Sciences and was a former Director-Professor of cardiology of JJ Group of Hospitals and Grant Medical College, Mumbai.

Goyal was born in the town of Sambhar Lake, Jaipur district.

Goyal was a visiting professor of cardiology at the University of Alabama in the USA and a visiting cardiologist to the Oschner Heart Institute, New Orleans. The State Government also honoured him by appointing him as the Professor Emeritus of Cardiology at the Grant Medical College. He served as a member of the Executive Council and Senate of the University of Bombay for several years. He was a member of the Central Council of Health and Family Welfare of the Government of India and also the Medical Council of India. Goyal has also written a book, Heart Talk. He was a former chairman of the Haffkins Institute.

An elected fellow of the National Academy of Medical Sciences, he was a recipient of the Padma Shri (1984), Padma Bhushan (1990) and the Padma Vibhushan (2005).

He was proposed for the post of the Vice President of India in July 2007 and was the Sheriff of Mumbai in 1980.

Goyal died in hospital on 20 February 2018 after suffering a cardiac arrest.

References

External links 
Profile at Bombay Hospital

Indian surgeons
Recipients of the Padma Vibhushan in medicine
Sheriffs of Mumbai
Recipients of the Padma Bhushan in medicine
Recipients of the Padma Shri in medicine
1935 births
2018 deaths
Fellows of the National Academy of Medical Sciences
20th-century Indian medical doctors
21st-century Indian medical doctors
Medical doctors from Rajasthan
People from Jaipur district
20th-century surgeons